Daniel E. Greene PSA, NA, AWS (February 26, 1934 – April 5, 2020) was an American artist who worked in the media of pastels and oil painting. The Encyclopædia Britannica considered Mr. Greene the foremost pastelist in the United States. His paintings and pastels are in over 700 public and private collections in the United States and abroad. Highly regarded as a portrait artist, his subjects have included leaders of Government, Banking, Education and Industry. Some of his sitters include First Lady Eleanor Roosevelt, Ayn Rand, Astronaut Walter Schirra, William Randolph Hearst, “Wendy’s” founder Dave Thomas, Commentator Rush Limbaugh, Composer Alan Menken, Bryant Gumbel and Bob Schieffer of CBS TV. Governmental Portraits include Secretary of Agriculture Ann Veneman, Governor Paul Laxalt of Nevada, Governor Gerald Baliles of Virginia, Governor Benjamin Cayetano of Hawaii, and Governor Fob James of Alabama. Business sitters include the chairmen of the boards of Honeywell, Coca-Cola Company, Dupont Corporation, Endo Pharmaceuticals, American Express, The New York Stock Exchange and IBM. Mr. Greene has also painted the Deans, Presidents and Benefactors of Hobart & William Smith Colleges, Tufts, Duke, Columbia, North Carolina, West Point, Delaware, Penn State, New York, Princeton, Rutgers, Yale and Harvard Universities.

On May 26, 1994 in a special White House ceremony, Mr. Greene presented to First Lady Hillary Clinton a pastel portrait of Eleanor Roosevelt.
In 2011, The Butler Institute of American Art acquired Mr. Greene’s pastel diptych “Man Flying Kite”.

Biography
Daniel Greene was born in 1934 in Cincinnati, Ohio, and died on April 5, 2020 in North Salem, NY. He was 86 years old.
He studied at the Art Academy of Cincinnati 1944-46, and the Art Students League of New York 1953-55. He is the author of the book “Pastel” that was in print for 25 years and “The Art of Pastel”, which were published in English, French, Spanish, Italian and Chinese. He also has produced six instructional videos in the subjects of portrait drawing, color method, pastel and oil painting.

Greene lived and worked in New York State. His popular workshops were held each summer in his studio in North Salem, NY. He was married to Wende Caporale, who is also a portrait artist and illustrator and works in pastel and oil painting. In the past, he worked as an instructor of painting at the National Academy of Design and the Art Students League of New York. Greene has taught over 10,000 students in the United States and abroad.

Career

Awards
His website indicates the following awards have been made
 In 1963, Greene was the recipient of the Anna Lee Stacey Foundation Grant.
 In 1964, Greene was the recipient of the Elizabeth T. Greenshields Foundation Grant 
 In 1967, he was elected into the National Academy of Design
 In 1992, he was awarded American Artist's magazine's first Lifetime Achievement award in the category of oil painting and the Oil Painters of America Society named him to their Hall of Fame.
 In 1995, the American Society of Portrait Artists presented the John Singer Sargent award to Daniel Greene for lifelong dedication to the achievement of excellence in portraiture.
 In May 1999, Greene was the recipient of the Benjamin Clinedinst Medal of the Artist's Fellowship at a presentation in New York City.
 In 2001, he was awarded the Gold Medal of the Portrait Society of America.
 In 2003, Greene was the annual honoree of the Salmagundi Club and was presented their Gold Medal.
 In 2003, The Pastel Society of the West Coast named Mr. Greene a Pastel Laureate.
 In 2003, Greene was presented with the Joseph V. Giffuni Award by the Pastel Society of America.
 In 2006, Greene was the Artist in Tribute at the 75th Annual Exhibition of the Hudson Valley Art Association.
 In 2007, Greene was presented with the Gladys E. Cook Award for Painting by the National Academy Museum at their 182nd Annual Members Exhibition.
 In 2007, Greene was presented with the Great American Artworks Award by the Pastel Society of America.
 In 2007, Greene was presented with the First Place - Landscape Award at the ARC International Salon by the Art Renewal Center.
 In 2011, Greene was presented with the Herman Marguilies Award for Excellence by the Pastel Society of America at their 39th Annual Exhibition.
 In 2011, Greene was presented with The Art Spirit Foundation Award by the Salmagundi Club at their 128th Annual Member Exhibition.
 In 2012, Greene was honored with the Lifetime Achievement Award by the Connecticut Society of Portrait Artists at their “Faces of Winter – A Daniel Greene Festival”.
 In 2012, Greene was presented with the Distinguished Artists Award by the Oil Painters of America at their 21st Annual National Juried Exhibition of Traditional Oils.
 In 2012, Greene was presented with the Gene Magazzini Memorial Award for Traditional Oil by the Salmagundi Club at their 129th Annual Exhibition.
 In 2012, Greene was presented with the Jack Richeson Gold Award by the Pastel Society of America at their 40th Annual Exhibition.

Portraiture
Daniel Greene is a portrait artist.  In 1998 he became a member of the Board of Directors of the Portrait Society of America.

Work in Pastels
His work in pastels has been recognised by:
 The Encyclopædia Britannica which considers Mr. Greene the foremost pastelist in the United States.

 in 1983, the Pastel Society of America elected him to the Pastel Hall of Fame.
 In 1989, his work represented the United States at the first International Biennial of Pastel in San Quentin, France.
 In 2003, the Pastel Society of the West Coast named Mr. Greene a Pastel Laureate.
His book, Pastel, is an instructional treatise for artists who work in the medium.
His paintings and pastels are in over 700 public and private collections in the United States and abroad. He has two instructional DVDs available for pastel portraiture painting; "Jim" 160 minutes and "Erika" 90 minutes.

Museum and other Collections
Among other places, his work can be found at the Smithsonian; the Metropolitan Museum of Art, New York, NY; the Cincinnati Museum of Fine Arts, Cincinnati, Ohio; Columbus Museum of Art, Columbus, Georgia ; Butler Institute of American Art, Youngstown, Ohio and the House of Representatives, Washington, DC.

References

External links
Daniel E. Greene website
Pastel Society of America - Hall of Fame
 Portrait Society of America - Board of Members

1934 births
2020 deaths
20th-century American painters
American male painters
21st-century American painters
21st-century American male artists
Artists from Cincinnati
Art Students League of New York faculty
Art Students League of New York alumni
20th-century American male artists
Pastel artists